Makruk, or Thai chess, is a board game that is descended from the 6th-century Indian game of chaturanga or a close relative thereof, and is therefore related to chess. It is part of the family of chess variants. The word "ruk" in Thai is thought to derive from "rukh" which means "chariot" in the Persian language (and is also the common origin of the name for a rook in western chess). The Persian traders came to the Ayutthaya kingdom around the 14th century to spread their culture and to trade with the Thai kingdom. It is therefore possible that the Siamese Makruk, in its present form, was directly derived from the Persian game of Shatranj via the cultural exchange between the two peoples in this period. This is because the movement of Makruk's queen, or the "seed", is essentially the same as the ferz in Shatranj.

Rules

Pieces

 The cowrie shell moves one space forward and captures one space diagonally forward. Unlike in western chess, the pawn cannot advance two squares on its first move; therefore, it cannot be captured en passant. A pawn that reaches the sixth rank is always promoted. It becomes a "promoted pawn" (เบี้ยหงาย bia ngai, in Thai, meaning overturned cowrie shell), which moves one square diagonally in any direction, like the queen. Pawn promotion is usually denoted by flipping the piece over.

 The seed called moves one space diagonally, like the ferz in shatranj . It has the same move as the promoted pawn.

 The nobleman moves one space diagonally or one space forward, like the silver general in shogi.

 The horse moves two spaces orthogonally (that is, along a rank or file) and then one space perpendicular to that movement. It jumps over any pieces in the way, like the knight in western chess.

 The boat moves any number of spaces orthogonally, like a rook in western chess.

 The lord moves one space in any direction, like a king in western chess. The game ends when the king is checkmated.  The game ends as a draw if the king is stalemated, like in western chess and unlike shatranji.

In the starting position, pawns are placed on the third and sixth ranks. Queens are placed at the right side of kings.

Counting rules

When neither side has any pawns, the game must be completed within a certain number of moves or it is declared a draw. When a piece is captured the count restarts only if it is the last piece of a player in the game.

 When neither player has any pawns left, mate must be achieved in 64 moves. The disadvantaged player counts, and may at any time choose to stop counting. If the disadvantaged player checkmates the advantage side and did not stop counting, the game is declared a draw.

When the last piece (that is not the king) of the disadvantaged player is captured, the count may be started, or restarted from the aforementioned counting, by the weaker player, and the stronger player now has a maximum number of moves based on the pieces left:

 If there are two rooks left: 8 moves
 If there is one rook left: 16 moves
 If there are no rooks left, but there are two bishops: 22 moves
 If there are no rooks or bishops left, but there are two knights: 32 moves
 If there are no rooks left, but there is one bishop: 44 moves
 If there are no rooks or bishops left, but there is one knight: 64 moves
 If there are no rooks, bishops or knights left, but only queens: 64 moves

The disadvantaged player announces the counting of his fleeing moves, starting from the number of pieces left on the board, including both kings. The winning player has to checkmate his opponent's king before the maximum number is announced, otherwise the game is declared a draw. During this process, the count may restart if the counting player would like to stop and start counting again.

For example, if White has two rooks and a knight against a lone black king, he has three moves to checkmate his opponent (the given value of 8 minus the total number of pieces, 5). If Black captures a white rook, the count does not automatically restart, unless Black is willing to do so, at his own disadvantage. However, many players do not understand this and restart the counting while fleeing with the king.

Variants
There are rules which do not apply to the standard, formal game, or have been abandoned in professional play. They are called sutras. The first free moves are similar to those in Cambodian Ouk.

 Sut Khun สูตรขุน (King Sutra) can be compared to the castling rule in western chess. The rule allows the player to move the king to a blank square on next row, like a knight, so long as the king hasn't moved yet.
 Sut Met สูตรเม็ด (Queen Sutra) is the most popular sutra in informal rules. It is a first free move that allows the player to move the queen and the pawn in front of the queen at the same time. Two pieces are moved in this sutra. First, move the pawn in front of the queen forward; then move the queen to the blank square the pawn has just vacated, so the queen moves two squares forward.
 Sut Ma สูตรม้า (Knight Sutra) is a first free move that allows the player to move a knight and a pawn a knight's move from that knight in the same turn. Two pieces are moved in this sutra. First, move the pawn which is a knight's move from the knight forward; then move the knight to the blank square the pawn has just vacated.
 Takhaeng Ruea ตะแคงเรือ (Boat Tilting, Rook Tilting): Turn one or both rooks upside down. This changes the rook to be a queen. This reduces the power of one or two rooks.

Cambodian chess

The variety of chess played in Cambodia, called Ok or Ok Chaktrang, is virtually identical to makruk, with minor differences.  The Cambodian name of Ok Chaktrang is similar to the Persian name of chess, Chatrang.  If no pieces have been captured, the players have these options:

 On the king's first move, and only if not in check, of moving the king like a knight; and
 On the queen's first move, of moving the queen two squares straight ahead.

There is evidence that Ok has been played in Cambodia since the twelfth century, as it is depicted in several reliefs in the Angkor temples.

The first Ok tournament was held in Cambodia 3–4 April 2008, upon the completion of a standardized rule set by the Olympic Committee of Cambodia and the Cambodian Chess Association.

In a variant Ka Ok (also known as Kar Ok), the first player to put the other in check wins. Another variant of Cambodian chess was described by David Pritchard in the first edition of The Encyclopedia of Chess Variants, but this was later determined to have been included in error as no such game was played in Cambodia.

References

External links

MakrukThai AI หมากรุกไทย เอไอ
"Alisa" The world strongest Makruk program
How to play Thai Chess
How to play Thai Chess - by Ancient Chess.com
Makruk | Chess Variant Pages
Makruk: Chess in Cambodia
Ouk chatrang (Cambodian chess) and makruk (Thai chess)
Free Makruk chess pieces ( svg file format )
How to Play Makruk (หมากรุก): The Chess of Thailand

Games related to chaturanga
Thai sports and games
Thai games